Mamuju is an Austronesian language spoken on the island of Sulawesi in Indonesia.

The dialects of Mamuju include Mamuju, Sumare-Rangas, Padang, and Sinyonyoi. The Mamuju dialect is considered more prestigious. Its written form is based on Latin alphabet.

Although Mamuju is traditionally classified as South Sulawesi, it has various words of Wotu–Wolio origin.

References

External links
 "Listening to (and Saving) the World's Languages". 29 April 2010 New York Times article by Sam Roberts
 Endangered Language Alliance

Languages of Sulawesi
South Sulawesi languages